Randy Grimes (born July 20, 1960) is a former professional American football player who played center for the Tampa Bay Buccaneers from 1983 to 1992.

Playing career
Grimes played for Baylor University during the early 1980s and was a part of the 1980 Southwest Conference Champion Bears, which also included the likes of other NFL players Mike Singletary, Alfred Anderson, Mark Kirchner, Vic Vines, Walter Abercrombie, and Vann McElroy.

Painkiller addiction
Grimes became addicted to painkillers while playing in the NFL, and was taking up to 45 pills a day. He recovered through the help of a rehabilitation facility, and currently works as a counsellor at that same facility.

References

1960 births
Living people
American football centers
Baylor Bears football players
Players of American football from Texas
Sportspeople from Tyler, Texas
Tampa Bay Buccaneers players